Prince Eugene most commonly refers to:
 Prince Eugene of Savoy (1663–1736), Field marshal in the army of the Holy Roman Empire and of the Austrian Habsburg dynasty

Prince Eugene may also refer to:

People
 Prince Eugen, Duke of Närke (1865–1947), Swedish painter, art collector and patron of artists

Warships
 SMS Prinz Eugen, several Austro-Hungarian warships
 German cruiser Prinz Eugen (later USS Prinz Eugen), a World War II heavy cruiser
 , a British World War I monitor
 Italian cruiser Eugenio di Savoia, a World War II light cruiser

Other uses
 7th SS Volunteer Mountain Division Prinz Eugen, a division of the German Waffen-SS
 Prinz Eugen (train), an express train connecting Austria and Germany
 Prinz Eugen, a 1960 biography by Alexander Lernet-Holenia
 Prinz Eugen, der edle Ritter, a folksong